St. Abbs Head virus (SAHV) is a virus in the genus Phlebovirus, order Bunyavirales. It is named after St Abb's Head, Scotland, where it was isolated from its vector, the tick Ixodes uriae.

References

Phleboviruses
Infraspecific virus taxa